Evan Penny (born 1953, in South Africa), currently lives and works in Toronto, Ontario, Canada. In 1978, Penny graduated from the Alberta College of Art and Design and received a post-graduate degree in sculpture.

Evan Penny makes sculptures of human forms out of silicone, pigment, hair and aluminium. His pieces range from the almost precisely lifelike, to the blurred or stretched. Penny says one of his interests "is to situate the sculptures perceptually between the way we might see each other in real time and space and the way we imagine our equivalent in a photographic representation." Though his creations are lifelike, Penny believes that "the real can't be represented or symbolized," leaving everything to be a representation.

Early works 
Evan Penny’s early works include sculptures, as well as digital photographs. Penny sculptures go beyond the concept of photorealism in three-dimensional space. In his early figural sculptures, Penny stays true to an undistorted, classical human form, although the scale is typically smaller than life-size. One of the most notable pieces from this group is Ali (1984); a full-figure nude of a young woman. The sculpture is hyper-articulated, and Penny renders every inch of the woman’s body in great detail. The result is an uncanny and surreal effect. Penny’s early figurative sculptures were brought together in Absolutely Unreal, a major survey of the artist’s work that traveled to the Museum London in London, Ontario, the Mendel Art Gallery in Saskatoon, Saskatchewan and the Glenbow Museum in Calgary, Alberta (2003–2006).

No One - In Particular (2004–2007) 

No One – In Particular is a grouping of twice life-size sculptures that push the boundaries of representation between the two-dimensional and three-dimensional. These sculptures are imaginary portraits constructed to look like ordinary people but with larger parts of the body. These realistic sculptures are not modeled after a particular person, but rather are amalgamations of human features, generating commentary about the expectation of truth within photography. Penny continues to push the boundary on contemporary sculptural realism in these works through accentuating the variability in the human form.

Stretch / Anamorphs (2003–2008) 

Penny’s Stretch and Anamorph sculptures further expand the boundaries of distortion within a three-dimensional space. These works stretch, blur and manipulate the human form in space much in the way that two-dimensional digital photography can be manipulated. In works such as Stretch #1 2003, Penny’s traditional busts are vertically stretched elongating the head and shoulders while staying true to his hyper-realistic rendering of the human face.

Penny’s Panagiota works are a subset of this series. The idea of time is directly addressed with the Panagiota pieces. The work visually charts a conversation Penny has with a young woman by rendering her facial expression at different points in their conversation—bringing time-photography directly into sculptural form.

Backs (2004–2008) 

Penny created a series of hyper-real sculptures of the backs of individuals. These sculptures continue the domain of neither fully two-dimensional nor three-dimensional forms in Penny’s work. There are no faces on the sculptures; however, the shoulders, neck and back of the head are meticulously rendered. Back of Evan is a piece completed in 2005 of a bald man facing slightly to the right. This sculpture is so carefully crafted that one can see the folds in the man’s neck.

Recent works 

Penny’s most recent works increasingly utilize new technologies to render hyper-realistic sculpture. In 2011 Penny created his largest sculpture to date, Jim Revisited, a 10 foot tall man with a commanding presence. As the model for this new sculpture Penny revisited his 1985 piece, Jim, a diminutive 4/5 life-size sculpture positioned in a contrapposto stance. In Jim Revisited, Penny used digital scanning technology to dramatically re-size and manipulate the stance. He then reworked the surface in clay to add greater detail. The progression of Jim from 1985 to 2011, exemplifies the development of Penny’s sculpture over the last 26 years, in addition to reflecting the advance of technology, photography, and the representation of the body in a digital imaging age. Recently Penny has also sculpted two self-portraits — one of himself as he remembers himself looking as a young man, and another as he imagines he will look at an old age. These two sculptures reveal Penny’s self-reflection through a continuum of time, and alludes to the subjective nature of memory and desire, and how photographic images inform and distort perception and representations of the Self.

Exhibitions 
 2011: Evan Penny. Re Figured, Kunsthalle Tübingen, later on Museum der Moderne Salzburg and Art Gallery of Ontario, Toronto
 2012–2013: Lifelike, group show originated at the Walker Art Center, traveling to the New Orleans Museum of Art, the Museum of Contemporary Art, San Diego, and Blanton Museum of Art in Austin, Texas

Awards
 1997 Victor Martyn Lynch-Staunton Award from the Canada Council.

References

Bibliography 
 
 Alberto Fiz/Daniel Schreiber (Eds.): Evan Penny. Re Figured, Buchhandlung König, Köln, Germany 2011

External links 
 evanpenny.com
 Evan Penny at Sperone Westwater
 Evan Penny artist-portrait by CastYourArt, 2012 

South African sculptors
Canadian sculptors
South African people of British descent
South African emigrants to Canada
Living people
1953 births